A sporting director, or director of sport, is an executive management position in a sports club. The role is well known as a manager role for European football clubs, which are sometime also "sports clubs", offering many types of sports. The sporting director is, in many cases, a member of the executive board and therefore an executive director. The sporting director is usually directly subordinate to the CEO or the chairman of the sports organization.

Director of football 
A director of football, sometimes also called a sporting director or technical director, is a senior management figure at an association football club, most commonly in Europe. Often, their key task is managing transfers of players to and from the team. However, the nature of the position varies, and their role at a particular club may be more specialized.

References

Terminology used in multiple sports

Association football occupations
Leadership positions in sports
Association football terminology
 
Ice hockey occupations